Ahmed Naguib el-Hilaly (1 October 1891 – December 1958) was an Egyptian lawyer and educator who served as Prime Minister of Egypt twice in 1952.

Life and career
Born in Asyut, el-Hilaly graduated from Khedival Law School and began his career in the Niyaba. He was appointed as a professor in 1923, rising to secretary-general of the Ministry of Public Instruction. He became a royal advisor on education and served as education minister under Muhammad Tawfiq Nasim Pasha from 1934 to 1936. He joined the Wafd Party in 1938 and served in the cabinet of Mustafa al-Nahhas in 1937 to 1938 and in his second cabinet from 1942 to 1944. His publications on education reform paved the way for reforms, including free universal public education in Egypt, day care, earlier entrance to school and longer compulsory education. The University of Alexandria opened while he was in office. El-Hilaly became chancellor of the Niyaba in 1931.

El-Hilaly broke from the Wafd Party in 1951. He served as prime minister for 4 months in 1952 immediately following the 1952 Cairo Fire. He also served as prime minister for one day before the Egyptian Revolution of 1952. His cabinet was announced on 22 July 1952. He was briefly imprisoned and was thereafter banned from politics. He died one month after his wife in Maadi.

References

External links

1891 births
1958 deaths
20th-century prime ministers of Egypt
People from Asyut
20th-century Egyptian lawyers
Wafd Party politicians
Education Ministers of Egypt